P127 may refer to:

 Papyrus 127, a biblical manuscript
 , a patrol boat of the Turkish Navy
 P127, a state regional road in Latvia